The 2009 Cincinnati Bearcats football team represented the University of Cincinnati in the 2009 NCAA Division I FBS football season. The team, coached by Brian Kelly, played its home games in Nippert Stadium.

They won their second consecutive Big East Conference championship and played in their second consecutive Bowl Championship Series game, the Sugar Bowl vs Florida. It was also the second BCS bowl appearance in school history.

The Bearcats finished third in the 2009 Bowl Championship Series rankings. The Bearcats became the first team from a BCS conference to finish the regular season unbeaten and be left out of the BCS Championship Game since Auburn in 2004.  However, had Texas lost the 2009 Big 12 Championship Game, the Bearcats would have had a realistic shot at playing in the BCS National Championship Game, since they would have been one of only two undefeated teams left from an AQ conference.

Head coach Brian Kelly resigned at the end of the regular season to take the head coaching job at Notre Dame. Offensive coordinator Jeff Quinn coached the Bearcats in the Sugar Bowl. Butch Jones began coaching the team in 2010.

The Bearcats were defeated by Florida 51–24 in the Sugar Bowl to end their undefeated season.

A heart-warming element of this amazing 2009 team was their adoption of Mitch Stone, a 12-year-old cancer patient, called "a key to this special season".

Schedule

Rankings

Game summaries
Cincinnati successfully defended its Big East title with a thrilling come from behind in win in Pittsburgh. While the game was the regular season finale for both teams it was seen as a defacto conference title game as the winner would have either the best outright conference record (Cincinnati) or the head to head tiebreaker (Pittsburgh) and be award the BCS bowl game slot in the Sugar Bowl. The 15th ranked Panthers started strong taking the opening kickoff and driving right down field to score with Dion Lewis scoring from 4 yards out. The Bearcats responded with a quick touchdown drive to tie the game, Jacob Ramsey bulling in from 2 yards out. The teams ended the first quarter tied at 7. The Panthers pounded the Bearcats with 24 second quarter points as they utilized the pinpoint passing of Bill Stull to score seemingly at will. Stull found Jon Baldwin twice for scores, Dan Hutchins added a 33 yard field goal and Stull run a QB sneak in from 3 yards out and the Panthers were up 31-10 and looking to put the game out of reach but on the ensuing kickoff after the Stull TD run. Mardy Gilyard took the kickoff at the one found a crease and raced 99 yards for a touchdown. That score seemed to stunt the Panthers title hopes. Though the Bearcats would only score once in the 3rd quarter on another long Gilyard score, this time on a 68 yard pass from Tony Pike, the Bearcats held the Panthers scoreless in the 3rd and would head to the decisive 4th down only 31-24. The deficit ballooned back to 14 on another scoring run from Lewis, the Bearcats got yet another long kick return from Gilyard and DJ Woods snagged an 8 yard touchdown pass from Pike. The extra point missed and the Bearcats trailed 38-30 The Bearcats tied the game on a short run by Isaiah Pead and a successful 2 point conversion and the Bearcats had fought back to level the game at 38. The Panthers were not done, though. Driving 67 yards in 4:10, Dion Lewis scored his 3rd touchdown of the game. Hutchins missed the extra point but the Panthers had a 44-38 lead with 1:36 left and dreams of crashing the Bearcats Big East title and BCS hopes in the snowy afternoon. But Pike and the Bearcats had other ideas. Racing back down field in just 63 seconds, the Bearcats were at the Panther 29. Pike dropped back to pass and found Armon Binns streaking down the sideline. His perfectly lobbed pass found a tumbling Binns in the end zone for the Bearcats first lead of the day with a scant 33 seconds left. The Panthers could do nothing with the time they had left and the Bearcats would celebrate its 2nd consecutive Big East Title and BCS Bowl berth. The Bearcats would finish the regular season with unbeaten for the first time in school history and its 12 wins would be a school record. The Bearcats would head to the bowl without Brian Kelly as it was announced just days after the game that he had accepted the head coaching position at Notre Dame. Jeff Quinn would coach the Bearcats in the Sugar Bowl and then he too would depart as he had accepted the head coaching position at Buffalo.

Pittsburgh

Roster

Awards and milestones

All-Americans
Mardy Gilyard, WR
 Andre Revels, LB 3rd Team Sporting News All American

Post-season finalists and winners
Home Depot Coach of the Year Award - Brian Kelly 
Eddie Robinson Coach of the Year Award - Brian Kelly (finalist)
Paul "Bear" Bryant Award - Brian Kelly (finalist)
Liberty Mutual Coach of the Year Award - Brian Kelly (finalist)
George Munger Award - Brian Kelly (finalist)

Big East Conference honors
Special Teams Player of the Year: Mardy Gilyard
Coach of the Year: Brian Kelly

Offensive player of the week
Week 1: Tony Pike
Week 4: Mardy Gilyard
Week 9: Zach Collaros
Week 12: Tony Pike
Week 13: Tony Pike

Special teams player of the week
Week 2: Mardy Gilyard
Week 6: Jacob Rodgers
Week 9: Jacob Rodgers
Week 13: Mardy Gilyard

Big East Conference All-Conference First Team

Mardy Gilyard, WR
Chris Jurek, OL
Tony Pike, QB
Mardy Gilyard, KR

Aaron Webster, DB

Big East Conference All-Conference Second Team

Armon Binns, WR
Jason Kelce, OL
Alex Hoffman, OL
Jeff Linkenbach, OL
Ben Guidugli, TE

Ricardo Mathews, DL

Players in the 2010 NFL Draft

References

Cincinnati
Cincinnati Bearcats football seasons
Big East Conference football champion seasons
Cincinnati Bearcats football